Soros Fund Management, LLC is a private American investment management firm. It is currently structured as a family office, but formerly as a hedge fund. The firm was founded in 1970 by George Soros and, in 2010, was reported to be one of the most profitable firms in the hedge fund industry, averaging a 20% annual rate of return over four decades. It is headquartered at 250 West 55th Street in New York.

Overview
Soros Fund Management is the primary adviser for the Quantum Group of Funds; a family of funds dealing in international investments. The company invests in public equity and fixed income markets worldwide, as well as foreign exchange, currency, and commodity markets, and private equity and venture capital funds.  The company is reported to have large investments in transportation, energy, retail, financial, and other industries.

Robert Soros stepped down as deputy chairman and president in June 2017. David Milich assumed most of his duties. In 2017, Dawn Fitzpatrick replaced Ted Burdick as Chief Investment Officer.

In the 2016 election cycle, Soros Fund Management donated over $10 million to Hillary Clinton's presidential campaign through super PACs.

History
The company was founded by George Soros and his former business partner Jim Rogers in 1970. Prior to starting the business Soros and Rogers worked together at the  investment bank Arnhold and S. Bleichroder.

1992 to 2007
In the week leading up to September 16, 1992 or "Black Wednesday," Quantum Funds earned $1.8 billion by shorting British pounds and buying German marks.  This transaction earned Soros the title of "the Man Who Broke the Bank of England".  On the other hand, British government policy in the period before the ejection of the pound sterling from the Exchange Rate Mechanism of the European Monetary System had been widely criticised for providing speculators with a one-way bet.

In 2000, the Quantum Fund lost its position as the largest hedge fund in the world when its assets under management changed $10 billion to $4 billion in about a year's time. The fund's losses were a result of investments in technology stocks.  That year, CEO Duncan Hennes, and the managers of the Quantum Fund, Stanley Druckenmiller, and Quota Fund, Nicholas Roditi, resigned. The restructuring of Soros Fund Management was announced in a shareholder letter that outlined its plan to merge the Quantum Fund with the Quantum Emerging Growth Fund to form the Quantum Endowment Fund. The intention was to transform the Quantum Fund into a "lower-risk, less-speculative fund" administered by an outside adviser.

2008 to 2011
The firm acquired a stake in Lehman Brothers just prior to its failure in 2008.

In 2009, Soros Fund Management partnered with six other hedge funds to acquire IndyMac Bank at a cost of $13.9 billion, thereby gaining control of an estimated $160 billion in bank loans, investments and deposits.

In 2010, the company was reported to have created $32 billion in profits since 1973, making it one of the top profit making hedge funds in the industry.

In 2011, the firm was reported to have $27.9 billion in assets under management and was ranked sixth on Institutional Investor's Hedge Fund 100 list. That same year, the company partnered with Silver Lake Partners and created fund called Silver Lake Kraftwerk whose focus was investing in natural resource and energy companies.

In July 2011, the fund announced plans to return just under $1 billion to investors by the end of 2011 to avoid reporting requirements under the Dodd-Frank reform act and to focus on family investments. That month, the company's chief investment officer Keith Anderson, co-founder of BlackRock left the firm.

2012 to 2020
In September 2016, Soros Fund Management advised a private investment fund tied to Quantum Strategic Partners, which injected the bulk of $305 million into SolarCity, producer of solar panels. The flow of cash allowed Elon Musk, chairman of Tesla Motors and SolarCity, to purchase SolarCity and merge it with Tesla.

In June 2018, the firm was reported to own 15% of Justify, the horse that won the 2018 Preakness Stakes, Kentucky Derby and Belmont Stakes, through the international breeding and racing operation of SF Bloodstock and SF Racing Group.

According to The Wall Street Journal, Soros Fund Management gained 8.9% in 2017 and 0.9% in 2018. In the first quarter of 2019, the fund had gained 1.9%.

In May 2019, it was announced that Soros Fund Management had built up a 3% stake in Swiss asset manager GAM.
In June 2019 Soros Fund Management led an investment in Vice Media for $250 million. In August 2019, Soros Fund Management increased its stake In Manolete Partners Plc To 11.67%. As of August, 2019, Soros Fund Management's largest holdings were Liberty Broadband, Vici Properties, and Caesars Entertainment.

In January 2020, George Soros announced at the World Economic Forum that he will commit $1 billion to the launch of an international university, The Open Society University Network, for research and education on climate change and dealing with authoritarian governments.

In April 2020, Amply Power, a company that provides charging solution for fleets, received its series A funding of $13.2 million from Soros Fund Management, Siemens, Congruent Ventures, PeopleFund, and Obvious Ventures.

In November 2020, Soros Fund Management disclosed that is holds 1% Class A shares in Palantir Technologies and announced that it has begun selling its shares as allowed because it disagrees with Palantir's business practices. In a statement to the CNBC, the company said, "SFM made this investment at a time when the negative social consequences of big data were less understood. SFM would not make an investment in Palantir today.”

Website
 Soros Fund Management

References

External links
 George Soros, "The Capitalist Threat" (The Atlantic, February 1997)

George Soros
American companies established in 1970
Hedge fund firms in New York City
Hedge funds
Investment management companies of the United States
Privately held companies based in New York City